Hermann Braun (29 May 1925 – 30 June 2002) was a German figure skater. He competed in the pairs event at the 1952 Winter Olympics.

References

1925 births
2002 deaths
German male pair skaters
Olympic figure skaters of Germany
Figure skaters at the 1952 Winter Olympics
Sportspeople from Cologne